Ariana Afghan Airlines Co. Ltd., also known simply as Ariana, is the flag carrier and largest airline of Afghanistan. Founded in 1955, Ariana is the oldest airline in the country and is state owned. The company has its main base at Kabul International Airport, from which it operates domestic flights and international connections to destinations in China, India, Pakistan, Russia, Saudi Arabia, Turkey, and the United Arab Emirates. The carrier is headquartered in Shāre Naw district, Kabul. Ariana Afghan Airlines has been on the list of air carriers banned in the European Union .

History

Early years

The airline was set up on 27 January 1955. It was established as Aryana Airlines with the assistance of Indamer Co. Ltd., which initially held a 49% interest, and the government of Afghanistan owned the balance. At the beginning, services were operated to Bahrain, India, Iran, and Lebanon, with a fleet of three Douglas DC-3s. In 1957, Pan American World Airways became the minor shareholder of the airline when it took over the 49% interest from Indamer. Domestic scheduled services started the same year. By , a fleet of three DC-3s was being used for linking Kabul with Amritsar, Delhi, Jeddah, and Karachi, as well as with some points within Afghanistan, while a single DC-4 operated the Kabul–Kandahar–Tehran–Damascus–Beirut–Ankara–Prague–Frankfurt service, so-called "Marco Polo" route. In the early 1960s,  from US aid to Afghanistan was used to capitalise the company.

By , the airline had 650 employees. At this time, the fleet comprised one Boeing 727-100C, one CV-440, one DC-3 and two Douglas DC-6s that worked on routes serving the Middle East, India, Pakistan, the USSR, and Istanbul, Frankfurt, and London. Domestic services were then operated by Bakhtar Alwatana, which was established by the government in 1967 for this purpose.

The carrier's first widebody aircraft, a McDonnell Douglas DC-10-30, entered the fleet in early . By , the aircraft fleet consisted of the DC-10 and two Boeing 727-100Cs. In the mid-1980s, during the Soviet–Afghan War, the carrier was forced to sell the DC-10 to British Caledonian, as the Soviets wanted the carrier to fly the Tupolev Tu-154 as a replacement. In , Ariana was taken over by Bakhtar Afghan Airlines, which became the country's new national airline. In , Bakhtar was merged back into Ariana, thus creating an airline which could serve both short and long haul routes.

Operational crisis

Following the fall of Kabul to the Taliban in 1996 and the proclamation of the Islamic Emirate of Afghanistan, the country faced substantial economic sanctions from the international sector during the Taliban regime. The sanctions, along with the Taliban government's control of the company and the grounding of many of the carrier's international flights, had a devastating effect on the economic health of the company through the 1990s. The fleet was reduced to only a handful of Russian and Ukrainian built An-26s, Yakovlev Yak-40s and three Boeing 727s, which were used on the longest domestic routes. In October 1996, Pakistan provided a temporary maintenance and operational base at Karachi. With no overseas assets, by 1999 Ariana's international operations consisted of flights to Dubai only; also, limited cargo flights continued into China's western provinces. However, sanctions imposed by UN Security Council Resolution 1267 in November 1999 forced the airline to suspend overseas operations. In , Ariana was grounded completely.

According to the Los Angeles Times:

According to people interviewed by the Los Angeles Times, Viktor Bout's companies helped in running the airline.

21st century

About a month later, the UN sanctions were finally lifted, permitting the airline to resume international routes again. In 2002, the government of India gave the carrier a gift of three ex-Air India Airbus A300s. In 2005, India signed an agreement on aviation cooperation with Afghanistan, with Air India training 50 officials for Ariana.

All commercial flights were cancelled following the Taliban taking over the capital city of Kabul in 2021. Domestic flights resumed in September.

EU ban 
In , all Afghanistan-registered aircraft were banned from operating in the European Union. Ariana is still included in the list as of June 2022.

Destinations

, Ariana Afghan Airlines serves three domestic and seven international destinations in Russia, Turkey, Saudi Arabia, the United Arab Emirates, India, and China; most of the routes radiate from Kabul.

Fleet

Current fleet
 the Ariana Afghan Airlines fleet consists of the following aircraft:

Historical fleet
Ariana operated the following equipment all through its history:

Airbus A300B4
Airbus A310-200
Airbus A320-200
Airbus A321-100
Antonov An-12BP
Antonov An-12T
Antonov An-24
Antonov An-24B
Antonov An-24RV
Antonov An-26
Antonov An-26B
Boeing 707-120B
Boeing 707-320C
Boeing 720B
Boeing 727-100C
Boeing 727-200
Boeing 727-200F
Boeing 737-300
Boeing 737-800
Boeing 747-200B
Boeing 757-200
Convair CV-440
Douglas C-47
Douglas C-47A
Douglas C-54B
Douglas C-54G
Douglas DC-4
Douglas DC-6A
McDonnell Douglas DC-10-30
Tupolev Tu-134
Tupolev Tu-154B
Tupolev Tu-154M
Yakovlev Yak-40

Accidents and incidents
According to Aviation Safety Network,  Ariana Afghan Airlines has written off 19 aircraft involved in 13 events, seven of them being deadly. Casualties totaled 154 deaths. The following list includes occurrences that led to at least one fatality, resulted in a write-off of the aircraft involved, or both.

See also
List of government-owned airlines
Transport in Afghanistan

References

External links

Official website

 
Airlines banned in the European Union
Airlines of Afghanistan
Airlines established in 1955
Government-owned airlines
1955 establishments in Afghanistan